Gembloux railway station, officially Gembloux, is a railway station in Gembloux, Namur, Belgium. The station was opened on 14 June 1855 by the Grande Compagnie de Luxembourg on railway lines 144, 147 and 161. It is operated by the National Railway Company of Belgium (SNCB/NMBS).

Nowadays, the station is primarily used by commuters travelling into nearby Brussels (40 minutes away) and Namur (10 minutes away). It has curved platforms allowing for high-speed rail to pass through without problem, allowing for speeds up to 200 km/h. The station itself is currently under expansion due to the high number of users from the growing population of Gembloux.

Train services
The station is served by the following services:

Intercity services (IC-16) Brussels - Namur - Arlon - Luxembourg
Intercity services (IC-17) Brussels Airport - Brussels-Luxembourg - Namur - Dinant (weekdays)
Intercity services (IC-17) Brussels - Namur - Dinant (weekends)
Intercity services (IC-18) Brussels - Namur - Liege (weekdays)
Local services (L-08) Ottignies - Gembloux - Namur

See also
 List of railway stations in Belgium

References

External links
 

Railway stations in Belgium
Railway stations opened in 1855
Railway stations in Namur (province)
Gembloux
1855 establishments in Belgium